The 2018–19 season is Sheffield Wednesday's seventh consecutive season in the Championship. Along with competing in the Championship, the club will also participate in the FA Cup and EFL Cup.

The season covers the period from 1 July 2018 to 30 June 2019.

Overview

Player transfers and contracts

Transfers in

Transfers out

Loans in

Loans out

New contracts

Competitions

Friendlies
As of 13 June 2018, Sheffield Wednesday have announced three pre-season friendlies against Lincoln City, Mansfield Town and Villarreal CF

Championship

League table

Results summary

Results by matchday

Matches

August

September

October

November

December

January

February

March

April

May

FA Cup
In the FA Cup, Sheffield Wednesday entered the competition in the third round and were drawn home to Luton Town. The fourth round draw was made live on BBC by Robbie Keane and Carl Ikeme from Wolverhampton on 7 January 2019.

EFL Cup

On 15 June 2018, the draw for the first round was made in Vietnam. The second round draw was made from the Stadium of Light on 16 August.

Squad statistics

Appearances

|}

Goalscorers

Includes all competitive matches.

Disciplinary record

Clean sheets

Awards

Player of the Month
Player of the Month awards for the 2018–19 season.

Player of the Year
Player of the Year award for the 2018–19 season.

EFL Awards

References

Sheffield Wednesday
Sheffield Wednesday F.C. seasons